Marlbank is a small community located in Tweed, Ontario, Canada, a few kilometers west of Highway 41.

In 1904, a fire erupted at the site which currently holds the tavern, but the building was rebuilt in 1905, and was known as The Stinson House. The owners opened their doors and served beverages to patrons. In 1907, the building and ownership changed hands to Mr. William O'Keefe, who renamed the pub after himself, calling it the O'Keefe House.

The business held fast to this name through several years and owners until 1938 when Sam Schell dubbed the building "The Marlbank House".

After a fire destroyed most of the building again in 1994, the tavern's name changed once more, quite fittingly, to "the Marlbank Phoenix Tavern". From early 2009, the Tavern was closed for almost two years and left to fall into disrepair. Two local residents, Ray and Ivy Hutchinson, and their son David, took it upon themselves to rescue and save this historical landmark. After major renovations, the Marlbank Phoenix Tavern reopened for business in January 2011.

Marlbank is the home of the hardest underwater cement in the world that built the Panama Canal. Marlbank village has many homes built from blocks using the same locally produced cement.

References

Communities in Hastings County